Ruben Bemelmans and Daniel Masur were the reigning champions but only Bemelmans chose to defend his title, partnering Jonathan Eysseric. Bemelmans lost in the first round to Jonáš Forejtek and Michael Vrbenský.

Albano Olivetti and David Vega Hernández won the title after defeating Sander Arends and David Pel 3–6, 6–4, [10–8] in the final.

Seeds

Draw

References

External links
 Main draw

Open Quimper Bretagne - Doubles
2022 Doubles